Pectenocypris korthausae is a fish species in the genus Pectenocypris from Sumatra and Borneo.

References

Pectenocypris
Fish described in 1982